Saint Benedict (also Cedar Hill) is an unincorporated community in St. Tammany Parish, Louisiana, United States. Its ZIP code is 70457.

Religion
The Roman Catholic abbey and seminary St. Joseph Abbey is in the community.

Notes

Unincorporated communities in St. Tammany Parish, Louisiana
Unincorporated communities in Louisiana
Unincorporated communities in New Orleans metropolitan area